Great South Africans was a South African television series that aired on SABC3 and hosted by Noeleen Maholwana Sangqu and Denis Beckett. In September 2004, thousands of South Africans took part in an informal nationwide poll to determine the "100 Greatest South Africans" of all time. Votes were cast by telephone, SMS, and the website of the state-run South African Broadcasting Corporation television channel, SABC3, which aired a series of profiles and documentaries in the weeks leading up to the announcement of the top 100. The programme was modelled on the BBC's Greatest Britons series.

In South Africa, the list was headed by Nelson Mandela, a predictable and obvious popular choice, given his global stature as a statesman and symbol of post-apartheid liberation and reconciliation. Other popular choices ranged from Professor Christiaan Barnard, the pioneering heart surgeon, to General Jan Smuts, wartime Prime Minister and co-founder of the League of Nations, to Shaka Zulu, the 19th Century warrior leader of the Zulu Nation, to Internet entrepreneur and civilian space traveller Mark Shuttleworth.

Two days after the list was announced, Nelson Mandela had already received several thousands of votes more than any other candidate.

Controversy
At the time when the competition was announced, in June 2004, the SABC gave the assurance that the South African show would not ban certain political figures, as was the case in the German version which banned Nazis from the list. They soon came to regret their decision when the SABC became embroiled in a national controversy over the high rankings accorded to some South Africans who were less widely regarded as "great".

For example, Hendrik Verwoerd, the "Architect of Apartheid", ranked higher on the list than Albert Luthuli, South Africa's first Nobel Peace laureate, or Chris Hani, a famous anti-apartheid activist. Also present on the list was Eugène Terre'Blanche, the head of the Afrikaner Weerstandsbeweging.

Other controversial choices included an 11th placing for Hansie Cronje, the disgraced former captain of the South African cricket team, who admitted to taking bribes to influence the outcome of test matches.

On 14 October, the SABC announced that the show was being cancelled, leaving positions 2 to 10 still formally undecided.

Letter columns in some newspapers called the show a farce and used the term "whites with cellphones" to explain the presence of Hendrik Verwoerd and Eugène Terre'Blanche high on the rankings. This view was rebutted by Afrikaans singer-songwriter Steve Hofmeyr who pointed out that Winnie Madikizela-Mandela, an anti-apartheid activist who was convicted of fraud post-apartheid, scored high on the list as well. According to Peter Matlare, CEO of the SABC, the show was stopped because "wider participation in the voting process" was necessary.

When the competition was announced, the SABC defined a Great South African as someone who contributed to the "country's life and development". When the show was stopped, the SABC claimed that their definition of a Great South African was actually someone who contributed to South Africa's development "and the promotion of humanity" and the fact that quite a few people on the list did not fit this description contributed to the decision to stop the show.

The list
This is the original list of "100 Greatest South Africans", with positions 2 to 10 still to be confirmed by public vote, before the show was taken off the air:

Other editions
Other countries have produced similar shows; see Greatest Britons spin-offs

See also
List of South Africans
They Shaped Our Century, a survey by Media24 in 1999 about 100 most influential South Africans (and people associated with South Africa) of the twentieth century

References

External links
Competition axed

South Africa
2004 South African television series debuts
2004 South African television series endings
Lists of South African people
SABC 3 original programming
South African documentary television series
South African television series based on British television series